Tissa Wijeratna Karalliyadde MP (born 10 May 1952) was Sri Lanka's former Cabinet Minister of Child Development and Women's Affairs and a Member of Parliament representing the Anuradhapura District.

He is an Agriculturist by profession and was educated at Nalanda College Colombo.

See also
 Cabinet of Sri Lanka

References

 Biographies of Present Members
 

Sri Lankan Buddhists
Alumni of Nalanda College, Colombo
Members of the 10th Parliament of Sri Lanka
Members of the 12th Parliament of Sri Lanka
Members of the 13th Parliament of Sri Lanka
Members of the 11th Parliament of Sri Lanka
Members of the 14th Parliament of Sri Lanka
Living people
1952 births
Sinhalese politicians